Ooredoo Maldives (formerly Wataniya Maldives) is a mobile operator in the Maldives, owned by Ooredoo Group.

History
The firm was issued a licence as the new mobile phone operator in February 2005. Ooredoo Maldives was selected after a bidding process with three other companies. All the bidders proposed competitive tariffs, but Ooredoo Maldives was investing heavily to deliver new services in the fastest possible time thus succeeded the competition. Currently they are providing GSM services throughout Maldives, with other value-added services. Ooredoo Maldives were the first operator to launch the first ever and fastest 3G and 4G Networks in the Maldives, and continued this trend by recently demonstrating the highest ever seen speeds in the country through 5G.

Registered as a service provider in GCC, Ooredoo is already a leading mobile phone operator in the Middle East and North Africa. It is proven that Ooredoo is currently serving a total of more than three million customers in Asia.

Ooredoo Maldives is the sole competitor of Dhiraagu, the very first Maldivian telecommunications company. Dhiraagu dominated the market for a period of 17 years, being the only operator for that period.

On 20 September 2021, Ooredoo Maldives was named as the title sponsor of 2021 SAFF Championship, a biennial international football tournament in South Asia.

Current standing 
The Company is part of the Ooredoo Group, an international telecommunications service provider with a customer base of over 138 Million spread across 10 countries as at December 31, 2016. The “Ooredoo” brand has been valued at US$3.1 Billion and recognized amongst the world's top fifty most valuable telecommunications brand by the leading intangible asset valuation consultancy, Brand Finance, in their “Telecoms 500 2017” report published on February 27, 2017.

Technological Innovations 
As a technological company, Ooredoo Maldives has committed in bringing the latest technological advancements to Maldives. in line with this commitment Ooredoo Maldives is at the helm of the digital transformation in the Maldives, supporting consumers and businesses to reach their full potential. Ooredoo Maldives were the first operator to launch the first ever and fastest 3G and 4G Networks in the Maldives, and continued this trend by recently demonstrating the highest ever seen speeds in the country through 5G.

On April 1, 2019, Ooredoo Maldives announced the rollout of HD Voice in the nation – an advanced telecommunication service enabled through Voice Over LTE (VoLTE) Services. Following in June 2019, Ooredoo Maldives enabled eSIM services and WiFi Calling in December 2019 for the very first time in the Maldives. To meet the evolving needs of its customers, Ooredoo Maldives continues to introduce new services, enabling everyone on the Ooredoo network to enjoy a great experience.

Governance 
Board of directors

The members of Ooredoo Maldives's board of directors are as follows:

Senior Management
|The members of Ooredoo Maldives's Senior Management are as follows:

Khalid Al-Hamadi is the CEO of Ooredoo Maldives, since February 2022 and is a Non-Independent, Executive Director. He is also the Managing Director of the Company effective from February 2022.

See also

 Telecommunications in the Maldives

References

Maldives
Telecommunications companies of the Maldives
Internet service providers
Telecommunications companies established in 2005
Telecommunications companies established in 2014